The  is a subcompact crossover SUV manufactured by Japanese automaker Toyota since 2016. The development of the car began in 2013, led by Toyota chief engineer Hiroyuki Koba. The C-HR is based on the same TNGA-C (GA-C) platform as the E210 series Corolla, and positioned between the Corolla Cross and Yaris Cross in size.

The production version of the C-HR was unveiled at the March 2016 Geneva Motor Show and started production in November 2016. It was launched in Japan on 14 December 2016. It went on sale in Europe, Australia, South Africa and North America in early 2017, and in Southeast Asia, China and Taiwan in 2018. The name C-HR can stand for either Compact High Rider, Cross Hatch Run–about or Coupe High Rider.

Initial production was in Japan and Turkey. The 2018–2020 model year North American-spec C-HR is imported from Turkey.



Concept model

Production model

Japan 
In Japan, the C-HR is sold at all Toyota dealership sales channels (Toyota Store, Toyopet Store, Toyota Corolla Store and Netz Store). The Japanese market C-HR is powered by either 1.2-litre turbocharged petrol engine, or 1.8-litre Hybrid. The FWD models are available with both engines, while the only motor for the AWD models is 1.2-litre turbo. Model grades are S, S-LED, G, S-T and G-T. Models S, S-LED, G are powered with a 1.2-litre turbo engine, while other models by a 1.8-litre Hybrid. LED Package is exclusive for the G and S-LED packages.

Asia 
The Thai-built C-HR with 1.8-litre 2ZR-FBE or 2ZR-FE engine is sold in certain Asian countries such as Thailand, Indonesia, Malaysia and Brunei. The ASEAN production version was unveiled in Thailand on 30 November 2017, at the 34th Thailand International Motor Expo.

For the Indonesian market, the C-HR was launched on 10 April 2018, initially with a 1.8-litre 2ZR-FE petrol engine. The hybrid variant followed later on 22 April 2019. The petrol variant was discontinued in March 2022. The remaining sole hybrid variant received Toyota Safety Sense on 27 May 2022.

In Brunei, the C-HR was launched in early 2018 and offered in the mid and high grade models with a petrol engine, and a hybrid model. It was discontinued in 2022.

For Singapore and Taiwan, the C-HR is only offered with 1.2-litre 8NR-FTS petrol engine. Singapore only gets the FWD model in Active and Luxury grades. Buyers in Taiwan can choose the FWD and AWD models.

For the Chinese market, the C-HR is sold by GAC Toyota, while its twin model sold by FAW Toyota is called the IZOA. The IZOA features a front bumper grille with horizontal lines instead of mesh on the C-HR. Both the C-HR and IZOA were revealed at the Auto Guangzhou in November 2017 and went on sale in April 2018. The electric vehicle (EV) variant of both the C-HR and IZOA were unveiled at the 18th Auto Shanghai on 16 April 2019, as the first battery electric vehicle in Toyota's upcoming lineup.

The C-HR EV went on sale in China in April 2020.

In late 2020, the comparatively expensive (being a fully imported model from Thailand) C-HR was discontinued in Malaysia, leading to declining sales. It was replaced by the Corolla Cross, launched in late March 2021.

Europe 
As in Japan, the C-HR for Europe can be purchased with either 1.2-litre turbocharged petrol, a 1.8-litre Hybrid or with 2.0-liter Hybrid. 
6-speed manual transmission is only installed in the front-wheel-drive 1.2-litre turbo; the sole gearbox for the 1.2-litre turbo AWD and the Hybrid is a CVT.

Trim levels vary across countries. In the UK, they are Icon, Design, Excel and Dynamic. For the French market, there are even more marketing name variations such as Active, Dynamic, Edition, Graphic, Distinctive and Collection. In Romania there are C-enter, C-ult Style and C-lassy. They are essentially similar cars with different standard or optional equipment.

Australia 
For the Australian market, the C-HR is only offered with the 1.2-litre, 8NR-FTS turbo motor. The base model is available in manual transmission as a FWD only, automatic transmission models may be FWD or AWD. The high level Koba model is available in both FWD and AWD variants. The gearbox for the base model is a choice of 6-speed manual transmission or CVT with 7-speed simulated gear. The Koba comes with CVT only, and is equipped with LED headlights, leather seats, heated front seats, and smart entry and start system.

North America 
Unique for the North American C-HR is the bigger 2.0-litre 3ZR-FAE naturally aspirated petrol engine which is matched to a CVT gearbox. In North America, it was originally planned to be sold as a Scion before that marque was discontinued.
The 2018 model year was only available in either the XLE or XLE Premium model. For the 2019 model year, the C-HR is available in LE, XLE, XLE Premium or Limited models.

The C-HR will be discontinued in the United States and Canada after the 2022 model year. The second-generation model will not be sold in those regions. The Corolla Cross continues as the brand's subcompact crossover/SUV offering.

Facelift 
The facelifted C-HR was unveiled in Japan, Europe, Australia, and North America in October 2019. The European model received the 2.0-litre M20A-FXS hybrid engine option for the first time. Android Auto and Apple CarPlay became standard. The GR Sport variant is also offered.

Gallery 
C-HR

IZOA

Safety

ASEAN NCAP

Sales

References

External links 

 

C-HR
Cars introduced in 2016
2020s cars
Mini sport utility vehicles
Crossover sport utility vehicles
Front-wheel-drive vehicles
All-wheel-drive vehicles
ASEAN NCAP small off-road
Hybrid sport utility vehicles
Partial zero-emissions vehicles
Vehicles with CVT transmission
Production electric cars